The following is a list of massacres that have occurred in the area of modern Iraq.

Pre-20th Century 
 In 1258, the Siege of Baghdad (1258): estimates range from 200,000–2,000,000 civilian deaths.

Pre-Saddam 20th Century 
 May 4, 1924, Massacre of 4th May, 1924; Assyrian Levies massacre an estimated 200 people after a Turkmen shop keeper and Assyrian soldier get into an argument.
 August 1933, the Simele massacre in Northern Iraq: the Iraqi army massacred 600–3,000 Assyrian Christians.
 June 1–2, 1941, Farhud, Baghdad; 175-780 deaths, considered "the beginning of the end of the Jewish community of Iraq".
 July 14, 1959, Kirkuk massacre of 1959; Kurdish members of the Iraqi Communist Party target Turkmens leaving an estimated 20 dead. This was followed by Kurdish soldiers from the Fourth Brigade targeting Turkmen residential areas with mortars, causing the destruction of 120 homes. Between 31-79 Turkmen were killed with 130 wounded. The Iraqi government referred to the incident as a "massacre".

Saddam Era 

 January 27, 1969 Baghdad hangings.
 September 16, 1969, the Iraqi military headed by Liutenant Abdul Karim al-Jahayshee massacred 47 people in the Assyrian village of Soriya (Ṣawriyā) including the Chaldean priest Ḥannā Yaʻqūb Qāshā and left 22 wounded.
 1975, Najaf purges. Over 100 Shi’ite clerics killed and 1250 arrested.  
 February 5 1977, Safar uprising. Despite brutally enforced ban on public religiousness, thousands of people defy it and head to Karbala during the Arba'een Pilgrimage. Hundreds were killed and thousands arrested by the regime. 
 1978 - 1979 Ba'athist Arabization campaigns in North Iraq; 2,500 to 12,500
 50,000 to 70,000 Shi'a, and 50,000 opposition activists, communists, Kurds and other minorities disappeared into Iraqi prisons in the 1980s 
 May 7, 1980, Persecution of Feyli Kurds under Saddam Hussein, Nationwide; 15,000–25,000 Feyli Kurds were targeted genocide via exportation and forced relocations.
 July 8, 1982, Dujail Massacre, Dujail; 148 deaths.
 May 10, 1983. Saddam ordered further arrest of all Hakim family. Hundreds were killed and buried in mass graves.
 In July and August 1983, on the orders of President Saddam Hussein over 8,000 men and boys of the Barzani Kurds, some as young as 13, were killed by the Ba'athist Iraq. 
 1984, Abu Ghraib prison massacre, Baghdad Governorate; 4,000 executed in purge
 1986–1989, Anfal genocide, Nationwide: 50,000-182,000 Kurds and other Iraqi minorities killed during Iran–Iraq War.
 March 16, 1988, Halabja poison gas attack, Halabja: 5,000+ deaths; Iraqi government used chemical weapons on Kurdish town; condemned as an act of genocide (The aforementioned Anfal genocide).
13 February 1991, Amiriyah shelter bombing, 408 civilians killed by US airstrike.
 March 1 – April 5, 1991 Iraqi uprisings, Nationwide: 25,000–180,000 killed (mostly civilians).

2000s 
 August 29, 2003, Imam Ali mosque bombing, 95 civilians including senior Shia cleric killed by Sunni extremists.
 May 19, 2004, Mukaradeeb wedding party massacre; 42 Iraqi civilians were killed by U.S. airstrikes during a wedding.
 August 1, 2004, 2004 Iraq churches attacks, Baghdad and Mosul; 12 died, 71 injured.
 October 24, 2004 Massacre of New Iraqi Army recruits by Sunni insurgents, 49 killed.
 November 19, 2005 Haditha killings, Haditha 24 Iraqi civilians were killed by United States Marines.
 March 15, 2006, the Ishaqi incident, where four women and five children, one aged five months were allegedly killed by U.S. Forces. This was denied by the Americans, who said a building collapsed during a firefight, killing four people—a suspect, two women and a child.
March 2006, US troops killed 4 Iraq prisoners.
 Between May 7 and 8, 2006, 51 bodies were found in Baghdad, all handcuffed, blindfolded and shot in the head and abdomen.
 March 27, 2007 2007 Tal Afar bombings and massacre, Tal Afar 152 Shiites were bombed; then Shiite-affiliated policemen after a bombing, 70 killed.
 April 23, 2007, 2007 Mosul massacre, Mosul; 23 died; the murders were considered to be a reprisal for the honor killing of a 17-year-old Yazidi girl.
 On April 17, 2007, 51 bodies of Iraqi civilians and military personnel, who were killed in the previous two years, were found in Mahmudiya, south of Baghdad.
 June 29, 2007, Al Ahamir Massacre, Al Ahamir, 10-14 Iraqi civilians were killed by Al Qaeda.
 On June 30, 2007, 35 to 40 bodies were recovered from a recently dug mass grave in the town of Ferris, south of Fallujah, most likely victims of sectarian violence.
 August 14, 2007, Qahtaniya bombings by Sunni insurgents, 796 killed.
 September 16, 2007, Nisour Square massacre, Baghdad: Blackwater Baghdad shootings by a private military company, 17 killed. The private military company, Blackwater Security Consulting, shot at Iraqi civilians killing 17 and injuring 20 in Nisour Square, Baghdad while escorting a US embassy convoy.
 Following the conclusion of the 2007 Diyala province military campaign dozens of mass graves were found. It is unclear who was responsible although Al-Qaeda is suspected.

2010s 
 April 4, 2010, insurgents dressed as US and Iraqi soldiers killed 25 people including 5 women in a village south of Baghdad. They were linked to the Awakening movement. They were handcuffed and shot in the head or chest. Seven were found alive in handcuffs. Major General Qassim Atta spokesman for the Iraqi security forces' Baghdad operations said Al-Qaeda in Iraq was behind this. 
 October 31, 2010, Baghdad church attack, Baghdad; 58 died; Islamic State of Iraq attacked a Catholic church.
 April 8, 2011, Camp Ashraf raid, Camp Ashraf; 34 unarmed members of the People's Mujahedin of Iran were killed by Iraqi security forces. 300+ injured.
 September 1, 2013, 2013 Camp Ashraf massacre, Camp Ashraf; 52 died; Members of Iran's Islamic Revolutionary Guard Corps helped plan and direct the assault on the camp and then two of Iran's Iraqi-based proxies, Kata'ib Hezbollah and Asaib Ahl al-Haq carried out the attack.
 June 12–15, 2014, Camp Speicher massacre in Tikrit; the Islamic State with the help the Sunni local tribes killed at least 1,700 unarmed Iraqi Air Force cadets. They were separated by sect: Sunnis were allowed to repent for their military service, while Shiites were lined up for firing squads. The soldiers were separated into small groups, executed and buried in mass graves; some of the victims were shot and thrown into the river
 June 10, 2014 – Badush prison massacre, over 670 Shia prisoners were executed by ISIL.
 June 10, 2014 – August 8 2015, Mass Executions in ISIS Occupied Mosul where over 6,539 people have been killed.
 August 2014 - Sinjar massacre, about 5,000 Yazidis massacred by ISIS.
 January 28, 2015 – Barwana massacre, 70 unarmed boys and men by Shia militas (allegedly).
 September 1, 2016 - Islamic State reportedly executed nine Mosul youths with a chainsaw for being part of an opposing group.
 March 17, 2017 – an airstrike by American-led bombing of Western Mosul that killed over 278+ civilians has been referred to as a massacre.

2020s

References

Iraq
Massacres

Massacres
Massacres